The Kabul markhor (Capra falconeri megaceros) is a near-threatened goat-antelope native to Afghanistan and Pakistan.

Capra (genus)
Mammals of Pakistan